Clarice Orsini (1453–1488) was the daughter of Iacopo Orsini, and his wife and cousin Maddalena Orsini both from the Orsini family, a great Roman noble house  and was the wife of Lorenzo de' Medici.

Life
Clarice and Lorenzo married 4 June 1469, with a four-day celebration.  The marriage was arranged by Lorenzo's mother Lucrezia Tornabuoni, who wanted her eldest son to marry a woman from a noble family to enhance the social status of the Medicis. Their marriage was unusual for Florence at the time in that they were nearly the same age.  Clarice's dowry was 6,000 florins.

The political nature of her marriage meant that she was often called upon by each side of her family to influence the other.  This included Lorenzo helping her brother Rinaldo get selected as Archbishop of Florence.  She was also called on by others throughout the area to support their requests to her husband.  People sought her support in the easing of taxes and releasing family members from exile or prison.  She would also use her network to gather information about political and military events away from where she was, including troop movements and battles.

Clarice's religious upbringing was a bit in contrast with the humanist ideals of the age popular in Florence.  Nevertheless, sources and letters suggest that there was a great deal of affection and respect between her and Lorenzo.   
Of the ten children born to them, three died in infancy.

During the Pazzi conspiracy, which was aimed at murdering Lorenzo and his younger brother Giuliano, Clarice and her children were sent to Pistoia. (The Pazzis succeeded in murdering Giuliano, but Lorenzo survived the attack, thus the conspirators' plan to replace the Medicis as de facto rulers of Florence failed).

Clarice returned to Rome several times to visit her relatives; she also visited Volterra, Colle Val d'Elsa, Passignano sul Trasimeno, and other places in the 1480s.  During these visits, she was treated as a representative of her husband, an unusual role for a woman in that time and place.

On 30 July 1488 she died in Florence, and was buried two days later. Her husband was not with her when she died, nor did he attend the funeral, because he himself was very ill and was in Bad Filetta near Siena to get cured. 

The fact that Lorenzo was away from home when she died, affected even more his mood. Piero da Bibbiena, private chancellor of the Magnificent, wrote the following letter to the Florentine Ambassador in Rome :

In a letter to Pope Innocent VIII he wrote that he dearly missed his late wife. The content of Lorenzo's letter to the Pope is the following:

Issue
Clarice and Lorenzo had ten children:
 Lucrezia de' Medici (Florence, 4 August 1470 – 15 November 1553); married 10 September 1486 Jacopo Salviati and had 10 children, including Cardinal Giovanni Salviati, Cardinal Bernardo Salviati, Maria Salviati (mother of Cosimo I de' Medici, Grand Duke of Tuscany), and Francesca Salviati (mother of Pope Leo XI).
 Male twins who died after birth (March 1471).
 Piero de' Medici (Florence, 15 February 1472 – Garigliano River, 28 December 1503), ruler of Florence after his father's death, called "the Unfortunate"
 Maddalena de' Medici (Florence, 25 July 1473 – Rome, 2 December 1528), married 25 February 1487 Franceschetto Cybo (illegitimate son of Pope Innocent VIII) and had eight children
 Contessina Beatrice de' Medici (23 September 1474 - September 1474), died young
 Giovanni de' Medici (Florence, 11 December 1475 – Rome, 1 December 1521), ascended to the Papacy as Pope Leo X on 9 March 1513.
 Luisa de' Medici (Florence, 1477 – May 1488), also called Luigia, was betrothed to Giovanni de' Medici il Popolano but died young.
 Contessina de' Medici (Pistoia, 16 January 1478 – Rome, 29 June 1515); married 1494 Piero Ridolfi (1467 - 1525) and had five children, including Cardinal Niccolò Ridolfi.
 Giuliano de' Medici, Duke of Nemours (Florence, 12 March 1479 – Florence, 17 March 1516), created Duke of Nemours in 1515 by King Francis I of France.

Their children were taught by Angelo Poliziano for a time. In 1478, he wanted to teach the children humanism, Latin, and Greek, but Clarice insisted on their lessons being more religious, and being delivered in Italian.  She had also removed the family and their teacher from Florence after the scare of the Pazzi conspiracy, and he chafed under the exile. In May 1479, she tried to dismiss the tutor over another change in the curriculum, though Lorenzo continued to pay him.

Ancestry

In popular culture 
She appears in the second and third seasons of Medici, played by Synnøve Karlsen.  She also appears in the Starz series Da Vinci's Demons played by Lara Pulver.

References

Sources

External links
Associazione Culturale "Clarice Orsini" - Monterotondo (Italy)

1450 births
1488 deaths
People from Monterotondo
Clarice
House of Medici
Italian Roman Catholics
15th-century people of the Republic of Florence
15th-century Italian women
15th-century deaths from tuberculosis
Tuberculosis deaths in Italy
Infectious disease deaths in Tuscany